Prurigo nodularis (PN), also known as nodular prurigo, is a skin disease characterised by pruritic (itchy) nodules which usually appear on the arms or legs. Patients often present with multiple excoriated lesions caused by scratching. PN is also known as Hyde prurigo nodularis, Picker's nodules, atypical nodular form of neurodermatitis circumscripta, lichen corneus obtusus.

Lichen simplex chronicus is a distinct clinical entity.

Signs and symptoms 
 Nodules are discrete, generally symmetric, hyperpigmented or purpuric, and firm. They are greater than 0.5 cm in both width and depth (as opposed to papules which are less than 0.5 cm). They can appear on any part of the body, but generally begin on the arms and legs.
 Excoriated lesions are often flat, umbilicated, or have a crusted top.
 Nodules may appear to begin in the hair follicles.
 Nodule pattern may be follicular.
 In true prurigo nodularis, a nodule forms before itching begins. Typically, these nodules are extremely pruritic and are alleviated only by steroids.

Causes
The cause of prurigo nodularis is unknown, although other conditions may induce PN. PN has been linked to Becker's nevus, linear IgA disease, an autoimmune condition, liver disease and T cells. Systemic pruritus has been linked to cholestasis, thyroid disease, polycythaemia rubra vera, uraemia, Hodgkins disease, HIV and other immunodeficiency diseases. Internal malignancies, liver failure, kidney failure, and psychiatric illnesses have been considered to induce PN, although more recent research has refuted a psychiatric cause for PN. Patients report an ongoing battle to distinguish themselves from those with psychiatric disorders, such as delusions of parasitosis and other psychiatric conditions.

Pathophysiology 
Chronic and repetitive scratching, picking, or rubbing of the nodules may result in permanent changes to the skin, including nodular lichenification, hyperkeratosis, hyperpigmentation, and skin thickening. Unhealed, excoriated lesions are often scaly, crusted or scabbed. Many patients report a lack of wound healing even when medications relieve the itching and subsequent scratching.

Patients often:
 seek treatment during middle-age, although PN can occur at any age.
 have a history of chronic severe pruritus.
 have a significant medical history for unrelated conditions.
 develop liver or kidney dysfunctions.
 develop secondary skin infections.
 have a personal or family history of atopic dermatitis.
 have other autoimmune disorders.
 have low vitamin D levels.

Diagnosis
Diagnosis is based on visual examination and the presence of itching. A skin biopsy is often performed to exclude other diseases. Lesion biopsies usually show light inflammation, sometimes with increased numbers of eosinophils. A culture of at least one lesion will rule out staphylococcus infection, which has been significantly linked to atopic dermatitis.

Treatment 
Prurigo nodularis is very hard to treat, but current therapies include steroids, Dupixent, vitamins, cryosurgery, thalidomide and UVB light. In the event that staphylococcus or other infection is present, antibiotics have proven effective, but tend to cause more harm than good for this particular disease. A physician may administer a strong dose of prednisone, which will almost immediately stop the itch/scratch cycle. However, cessation of steroids allows relapse to occur, usually within a few weeks. Horiuchi et al recently reported significant improvement in PN with antibiotic therapy.

Another drug a physician may administer is Apo-Azathioprine. Azathioprine, also known by its brand name Imuran, is an immunosuppressive drug used in organ transplantation and autoimmune diseases and belongs to the chemical class of purine analogues.

Dupixent was the first medication approved by the FDA in September 2022 to treat Prurigo Nodularis.

History 
Prurigo nodularis was first described by Hyde and Montgomery in 1909.

See also 
 Pruritus
 Skin lesion

Notes

External links 

 DermNet NZ: Prurigo nodularis
 

Pruritic skin conditions
Ailments of unknown cause